Frank Mazzola (March 7, 1935 – January 13, 2015) was an American actor and film editor.

Career
Mazzola was born in Los Angeles, California. As a child and young adult, Mazzola worked as an actor. In 1955, he acted in Rebel Without a Cause (among other films) with James Dean, Sal Mineo, Natalie Wood, and Dennis Hopper. He played "Crunch," a minor character, and was one of the last surviving cast members from that film.

In 1966, Mazzola started editing films; he edited Performance (1970 - uncredited), The Hired Hand (1971), Demon Seed (1977), The Secret Diary of Sigmund Freud (1984), and Wild Side (1995), among others. He worked with director Donald Cammell on three of his four feature films. Mazzola pioneered the non-linear editing style in Performance and other Cammell films, as well as the lyrical style that is found in The Hired Hand;
he also edited the well-received "director's cut" of Wild Side that was released four years after Cammell's 1996 death.

Mazzola died on January 13, 2015, at the age of 79.

Filmography

References

Further reading

1935 births
2015 deaths
American people of Italian descent
American film editors